John Woodruff is an American actor and director. He is best known for his short film, Lockbox and feature film, Animal Among Us.

Filmography

As Actor
 2003 - Night Shift
 2006 - Soulripperz
 2008 - Frat House Massacre
 2010 - Reflections
 2010 - True Nature
 2011 - Empty
 2013 - Within
 2014 - Murder Book
 2016 - The Stalker Experiment

References

External links
 

Living people
American film directors
American male film actors
American male television actors
Year of birth missing (living people)